Paola Reis (born 15 August 1999) is a Brazilian BMX rider.

Reis participated at the 2019 Pan American Games where she won a silver medal in the women's racing event.

In April 2021, Paola Reis became involved in a controversy with the Brazilian Cycling Confederation (CBC). She had failed to comply with the mandatory 14-day quarantine determined by the Brazilian Olympic Committee for Brazilians who embarked for the final training period before the World Cup stages that defined the Olympic quotas.

References

1999 births
Living people
Brazilian female cyclists
Brazilian BMX riders
BMX riders
Cyclists at the 2019 Pan American Games
Pan American Games medalists in cycling
Pan American Games silver medalists for Brazil
Medalists at the 2019 Pan American Games
21st-century Brazilian women